The 2020 Cavan Senior Football Championship was the 111th edition of Cavan GAA's premier gaelic football tournament for senior graded clubs in County Cavan, Ireland. The tournament consists of 12 teams, with the winner not representing Cavan in the Ulster Senior Club Football Championship, due to the latter competition's cancellation.

The championship starts with a league stage and then progresses to a knock out stage. The COVID-19 pandemic brought forward the beginning and end dates for the championship but the format was not changed, although there was no relegation this year.

Castlerahan were the defending champions after they defeated Ramor United in the previous years final to claim their second title in a row. However they were defeated by Crosserlough at the semi-final stage.

Crosserlough and Kingscourt Stars contested the final on 26 September but it ended as a draw. Crosserlough won the replay to win their first title in 48 years.

The drawn final was the first Cavan final to be shown live on RTÉ television.

Team Changes
The following teams have changed division since the 2019 championship season.

To Championship
Promoted from 2019 Cavan Intermediate Football Championship
  Laragh United  -  (Intermediate Champions)

From Championship
Relegated to 2020 Cavan Intermediate Football Championship
  Cootehill Celtic

League stage
All 12 teams enter the competition at this stage. A random draw determines which teams face each other in each of the four rounds. No team can meet each other twice in the group stage. The top 8 teams go into a seeded draw for the quarter-finals.

Round 1

Round 2

Round 3

Round 4

Knock-Out Stage

Quarter-finals

Semi-finals

Final

References

External links
 Official Cavan GAA Website

Cavan SFC
Cavan Senior Football Championship
Cavan GAA Football championships